Towarzystwo Sportowe Wisła Kraków Spółka Akcyjna, commonly referred to as Wisła Kraków, is a Polish professional football club based in Kraków. It currently competes in the I liga, the second level of Polish football league system. It ranks fourth in the number of national titles won (13), behind Górnik Zabrze, Ruch Chorzów (both on 14), and Legia Warsaw (15), and second in all-time victories. Wisła was founded in 1906 under the name TS Wisła (Polish: Towarzystwo Sportowe Wisła).

The club's coat of arms is a white star on a red background crossed by a blue ribbon.

Wisła Kraków was one of the most successful Polish football clubs of 2000s, winning eight league championships since 1999. Along with league titles, Wisła also won the Polish Cup on four occasions. Wisła also enjoyed some success in European competitions in the 1970s, reaching the quarter-finals in the 1978–79 European Cup

History

Wisła Kraków was founded in 1906 when students of the Second Practical School in Kraków, inspired by their professor Tadeusz Łopuszański, formed a football club.

In this first, historic season of the League, the fight for the championship was decided between two teams: Wisła Kraków and 1. FC Kattowitz. This rivalry was treated very seriously, not only by the two sides involved, but also by the whole nation. 1. FC was regarded as the team supported by the German minority, while Wisła, at the end of this historic season, represented ambitions of all Poles.

Some time in the fall of 1927 in Katowice, an ill-fated game between 1.FC and Wisła took place. Stakes were very high – the winner would become the Champion. Kraków's side won 2–0 and became the Champion. 1.FC finished second, third was Warta Poznań.

In 1949, the club was renamed to Gwardia-Wisła Kraków. In 1955 the club returned to its original name, TS Wisła. In 1967, the club was once again renamed, to GTS Wisła, a name which held until 1990 when the club reverted to its original name, TS Wisła. In the late 1990s, the football section of the club was incorporated and was renamed Wisła Kraków SSA.

The club has had its ups and downs, winning national championships and earning European qualification. It was also relegated to the second division on three occasions. Since the football section has been bought by Tele-Fonika Kable S.A. in 1998, the team has been far and away the most successful club in Poland, winning seven national championships and finishing in second place three times, totalling ten top two finishes in 12 years.

At international level, Wisła has competed in all three of the European competitions. The club's greatest success came in the 1978–79 season, when Wisła was able to reach the quarter-finals of the European Cup, eventually to be knocked out by Malmö FF 3–5 on aggregate. Most recently, Wisła narrowly missed out on a chance to compete in the 2005–06 UEFA Champions League group stage, being defeated 4–5 by Panathinaikos after extra time.

Wisła also twice reached the second round of the European Cup Winners' Cup in 1967–68 and 1984–85, falling 0–5 and 2–3 by Hamburger SV and Fortuna Sittard, respectively. The White Star has competed in the UEFA Cup ten times.

On 15 May 2022, Wisła was relegated to the I liga for the first time since 1996, after losing 4–2 against Radomiak Radom.

Stadium

Wisła's Stadium is located at 22 Reymonta Street in Kraków. The stadium was originally built in 1953 and currently has a capacity of 33,326.  The stadium was renovated in 2010, being upgraded to UEFA elite standards. The Wisła Stadium was also chosen as a reserve venue for the UEFA Euro 2012 tournament, jointly held in Poland and Ukraine. The record attendance of 45,000 at Wisła Stadium came on 29 September 1976 when Wisła defeated Celtic 2–0. The venue has been a fortress for Wisła, where the team is especially difficult to defeat. It is worth noting that Wisła holds the all-time Polish football record for consecutive league home games without a loss. The streak began following a loss on 16 September 2001 to KSZO Ostrowiec Świętokrzyski, and ended more than five years later on 11 November 2006, when GKS Bełchatów defeated Wisła 4–2. The number of matches without a loss was then settled at 73, overcoming the former Polish record of 48 which belonged to Legia Warsaw. During the 2008–09 season, Wisła lost points at home only twice, drawing with ŁKS Łódź and being defeated by Lech Poznań.

Supporters and rivalries

Fan Friendlies
Wisła fans formerly had long friendships relations with Lechia Gdańsk and Śląsk Wrocław, known as the "Three Kings of Great Cities" alliance until 2016, when their alliance fell apart. They formed a new group with Ruch Chorzów and Widzew Łódź (and by extension Elana Toruń, Slovan Bratislava and KKS Kalisz), which divided Wisła fans.

The fans have an amicable relationship with Polonia Przemyśl. Although Garbarnia Kraków, Puszcza Niepołomice and Kmita Zabierzów have no organised fan movements they are known to have local Wisła fans attend their games. Kmita was founded initially as Wisła Zabierzów as a local branch of the Wisła sports club.

The club also has close relations with Italian side Lazio since their Rome derby match in 2016, as well private contacts with CSKA Moscow and Vfl Bochum.

The fans formerly held relations with Unia Tarnów, Jagiellonia Białystok, Siarka Tarnobrzeg, Resovia Rzeszów and Zagłębie Wałbrzych.

Rivalries

With Cracovia

The term "Holy War" refers to the intense rivalry between the two Kraków-based teams; Wisła and KS Cracovia. In 1906, the establishment of the two first Polish football clubs, Cracovia and Wisła, created a rivalry that now dates back more than 100 years. The term "Holy War" was first used to describe the rivalry of Kraków's Jewish teams, Makkabi and Jutrzenka. A Jutrzenka defender, Ludwik Gintel, who later joined the Cracovia side referred to the derby match against Wisła as the "Holy War". The phrase was incorporated into a song and has since been popular amongst both Wisła and Cracovia fans.

The first recorded Kraków Derby was contested on 20 September 1908, a 1–1 draw. A historic derby match between Cracovia and Wisła occurred on 8 May 1913. It was the first time Polish teams played a championship game officially sanctioned by FIFA; Cracovia won 2–1. The most famous derby took place in 1948 when after the first post-war season, both Cracovia and Wisła accumulated an even number of points and the championship had to be decided by an additional game played at a neutral venue. On 5 December 1948, Cracovia defeated Wisła 3–1 and was crowned national champions. As of May 2011, the Kraków derby game between Wisła and Cracovia has been contested 183 times, with Wisła winning 82 times, tying 42 times and Cracovia winning 59 times.

With Legia Warsaw
The match contested between Wisła Kraków and Legia Warsaw, dubbed "The Derby of Poland", is commonly recognized as one of the greatest rivalries in Polish club football. Historically the two sides have been the most successful clubs in Poland, both in the top two in the all-time table. The rivalry between two of Poland's premier cities of Kraków and Warsaw sparks the rivalry even more. The regional differences of Kraków (south) and Warsaw (north), and the fact that Kraków used to be the capital of Poland before Warsaw (in the years 1041–1596) and the full official name of Kraków is Stołeczne Królewskie Miasto Kraków, or "Royal Capital City of Kraków" in English, also add a greater meaning to the match.

With Hutnik Kraków
The other Kraków derby is contested against Hutnik, historically the third team in Kraków representing Nowa Huta. Owing to Hutnik's lack of recent sporting success, the rivalry is mostly off-pitch and with Wisla's reserve team or in other sports sections of both clubs.

Other rivalries
Other rivalries are with Lech Poznań, Arka Gdynia and Tarnovia Tarnów, an extension of the fierce rivalry with Cracovia as all three maintain good friendships with them.

Fans of Zagłębie Sosnowiec, Korona Kielce, GKS Katowice, and Polonia Warsaw are also inter-regional fierce rivals.

Additional teams 
In addition to the professional team, Wisła Kraków plays also in the Polish Junior league.

Current squad

Out on loan

Current coaching staff

Sources:

Honours

Domestic
 Ekstraklasa (First league):
 Winners (14): 1927, 1928, 1949, 1950, 1951, 1977–78, 1998–99, 2000–01, 2002–03, 2003–04, 2004–05, 2007–08, 2008–09, 2010–11
 2nd place (10): 1930, 1931, 1936, 1948, 1965–66, 1980–81, 1999–2000, 2001–02, 2005–06, 2009–10
 3rd place (9): 1929, 1933, 1934, 1938, 1952, 1953, 1975–76, 1990–91, 1997–98

 Polish non-League Football Championship:
 2nd place (2): 1923, 1947
 3rd place (1): 1925
 Polish Cup:
 Winners (4): 1926, 1966–67, 2001–02, 2002–03
 Finalist (6): 1950–51, 1953–54, 1978–79, 1983–84, 1999–2000, 2007–08
 Polish SuperCup:
 Winner (1): 2001
 Finalist (4): 1999, 2004, 2008, 2009
 Polish League Cup:
 Winner (1) : 2000–01
 Finalist (1): 2001–02
 Polish First League (Second Division):
 Winner (1) : 1964–65
 2nd Place (3): 1985–86, 1988–89, 1995–96
 3rd Place (1): 1994–95
 Galician Championship:
 2nd place (1): 1913

Europe 
 European Cup/UEFA Champions League:
 Quarterfinal: 1978–79
 UEFA Cup/UEFA Europa League:
 Round of 16: 2002–03
 European Cup Winners' Cup
 Round of 16: 1967–68, 1984–85
 Intertoto Cup:
 Winners (3): 1969, 1970, 1973

Youth Teams
 Młoda Ekstraklasa:
 Winner (1): 2008
 2nd place (1): 2009
 Polish U-19 Championship:
 Winner (10: Polish record): 1936, 1937, 1958, 1975, 1976, 1982, 1996, 1997, 2000, 2014
 2nd place (1): 1938
 3rd place (3): 1974, 1987, 1998
 Polish U-17 Championship:
 Winner (1): 2013
 2nd place (1): 2003

Records
Team records
 Biggest win: 21–0 (8–0) – in Polish Championship elimination match with Pogoń Siedlce in Kraków, 24 August 1947.
 Highest home attendance: 45,000 – Wisła Kraków 2–0  Celtic (UEFA Cup), 29 September 1976.
 Highest home league attendance: 40,000 – Wisła Kraków 2–1 Legia Warszawa (Polish league), 7 August 1977.
 Debut in the league: 3 April 1927 in the first in league history.
 In the table of all time: 2nd place
 Consecutive matches without defeat in the league: 38 (25 October 2003 – 22 May 2005) – a record in the league
 Consecutive home matches without defeat: 73 (16 September 2001 – 11 November 2006) – a record in the league
 Biggest win in European competition:  WIT Georgia Tbilisi 2:8 Wisła Kraków, in Georgia, 27 July 2004 year. Wisła Kraków 7–0  Newtown, in Kraków, 29 July 1998.
Records individual
 Top scorer in the league:  Kazimierz Kmiecik – 153 goals in 304 matches
 Top scorer in the second league:  Grzegorz Kaliciak – 32 goals
 Top scorer (total):  Kazimierz Kmiecik – 181 goals in 350 matches
 Top scorer in European competition:  Maciej Żurawski – 23 goals
 Most matches in European Cups:  Marcin Baszczyński – 52 games
 Most meetings (total):  Arkadiusz Głowacki – 461 games
 The youngest debut:  Stefan Śliwa – 14 years, 268 days
 The oldest player:  Marcin Wasilewski – 40 years 39 days
 Most matches in the Polish national team:  Antoni Szymanowski – 65 games (a total of 82 games in the national team)
 Most goals in the Polish national team:  Maciej Żurawski – 14 goals
 Top scorer in one season:  Mieczysław Gracz and  Maciej Żurawski – 38 goals (all meetings),  Henryk Reyman – 37 goals (league only)
 All records

Wisła in European football
 Q = Qualifying
 PO = Play-Off

Notable players
Had international caps for their respective countries. Players whose name is listed in bold represented their countries while playing for Wisła.

 Poland
  Józef Adamek (1919–33)
  Mieczysław Balcer (1923–35)
  Marcin Baszczyński (2000–09)
  Jakub Błaszczykowski (2005–07), (2019–)
  Jacek Bobrowicz (1989–94)
  Rafał Boguski (2005–21)
  Paweł Brożek (1998–2010), (2013–20)
  Piotr Brożek (1998–2010), (2013–14)
  Krzysztof Budka (1975–85)
  Ryszard Budka (1955–68)
  Krzysztof Bukalski (1998–2001)
  Franciszek Cebulak (1923)
  Radosław Cierzniak (2015)
  Ryszard Czerwiec (1998–2002)
  Stanisław Czulak (1923–33)
  Piotr Ćwielong (2007–10)
  Tomasz Dawidowski (2004–09)
  Dariusz Dudka (2005–08), (2014–15)
  Tomasz Dziubiński (1989–91)
  Michał Filek (1933–49)
  Stanisław Flanek (1946–54)
  Tomasz Frankowski (1998–2005)
  Łukasz Garguła (2009–15)
  Witold Gieras (1920–23), (1924–28)
  Władysław Giergiel (1939), (1946–49)
  Arkadiusz Głowacki (2000–10), (2012–18)
  Konrad Gołoś (2005–10)
  Damian Gorawski (2003–04)
  Mieczysław Gracz (1933–53)
  Bolesław Habowski (1933–38)
  Krzysztof Hausner (1968–70)
  Zbigniew Hnatio (1970–71)
  Andrzej Iwan (1976–85)
  Jan Jałocha (1969–86)
  Marcin Jałocha (1987–92)
  Zdzisław Janik (1989–93)
  Maciej Jankowski (2014–15)
  Zbigniew Jaskowski (1945–55)
  Mariusz Jop (1999–2004), (2009–10)
  Jerzy Jurowicz (1933–55)
  Kazimierz Kaczor (1913–27)
  Paweł Kaczorowski (2006)
  Grzegorz Kaliciak (1992–96), (1998–2003)
  Radosław Kałużny (1998–2001)
  Zdzisław Kapka (1968–83), (1987)
  Jan Karwecki (1978–80)
  Władysław Kawula (1951–71)
  Marian Kiliński (1922–33)
  Walerian Kisieliński (1930–32)
  Tomasz Kłos (2004–06)
  Kazimierz Kmiecik (1968–82)
  Adam Kogut (1918–19)
  Józef Kohut (1948–54)
  Adam Kokoszka (2005–08)
  Marek Koniarek (1997)
  Tadeusz Konkiewicz (1923–25)
  Kamil Kosowski (1999–2008), (2013)
  Jan Kotlarczyk (1925–36)
  Józef Kotlarczyk (1927–39)
  Jacek Kowalczyk (2004–06)
  Władysław Kowalski (1923–30) 
  Maksymilian Koźmin (1927–36)
  Władysław Krupa (1921–27)
  Paweł Kryszałowicz (2005–06)
  Mariusz Kukiełka (2004)
  Tomasz Kulawik (1991–2002)
  Marek Kusto (1972–77)
  Marcin Kuźba (2002–03), (2004–06)
  Grzegorz Lewandowski (1989–93)
  Leszek Lipka (1976–90)
  Wojciech Łobodziński (2008–11)
  Antoni Łyko (1930–39)
  Marian Machowski (1950–63)
  Henryk Maculewicz (1971–79)
  Edward Madejski (1933–37)
  Radosław Majdan (2004–06)
  Bronisław Makowski (1927–31)

  Józef Mamoń (1947–54)
  Patryk Małecki (2001–14), (2016–19)
  Marian Markiewicz (1918–26)
  Radosław Matusiak (2008)
  Krzysztof Mączyński (2007–11), (2015–17)
  Adam Michel (1949–63)
  Stanisław Mielech (1910–11)
  Michał Miśkiewicz (2012–14), (2015–17)
  Fryderyk Monica (1954–70)
  Zdzisław Mordarski (1949–56)
  Kazimierz Moskal (1982–90), (1999–2003)
  Olgierd Moskalewicz (1999–2001)
  Marek Motyka (1978–89)
  Adam Musiał (1967–77)
  Adam Nawałka (1972–85)
  Janusz Nawrocki (1979–86)
  Andrzej Niedzielan (2007–09)
  Grzegorz Pater (1993–2003)
   Rudolf Patkoló (1951–52)
  Mariusz Pawełek (2006–10)
  Sławomir Peszko (2019)
  Rafał Pietrzak (2016–19)
  Zbigniew Płaszewski (1975–81)
  Tadeusz Polak (1958–73)
  Aleksander Pychowski (1925–35)
  Henryk Reyman (1910–33)
  Maciej Sadlok (2014–22)
  Piotr Skrobowski (1977–85)
  Emil Skrynkowicz (1923–31)
  Radosław Sobolewski (2005–13)
  Łukasz Sosin (1999–2002)
  Mariusz Stępiński (2014–15)
  Maciej Stolarczyk (2002–07)
  Henryk Stroniarz (1964–71)
  Zdzisław Styczeń (1924–26)
  Łukasz Surma (1995–98)
  Andrzej Sykta (1959–68)
  Igor Sypniewski (2002)
  Maciej Szczęsny (2001–02)
  Mieczysław Szczurek (1949–55)
  Antoni Szymanowski (1969–70), (1972–78)
  Henryk Szymanowski (1963–83)
  Mirosław Szymkowiak (2001–04)
  Stefan Śliwa (1912–24)
  Marek Świerczewski (1981–89)
  Marcin Wasilewski (2017–20)
  Kazimierz Węgrzyn (1998–2000)
  Jakub Wierzchowski (1998–99)
  Cezary Wilk (2010–13)
  Mieczysław Wiśniewski (1921–24)
  Rafał Wolski (2016)
  Artur Woźniak (1931–39)
  Michał Wróbel (1975–86)
  Mateusz Zachara (2016–17)
  Bogdan Zając (1995–2002)
  Marek Zając (1997–2002)
  Łukasz Załuska (2016–17)
  Marek Zieńczuk (2004–09)
  Mieczysław Zimowski (1911–19)
  Maciej Żurawski (1999–2005), (2010–11)
  Michał Żyro (2022–)
 Albania
  Vullnet Basha (2017–21), (2022–)
 Australia
  Jacob Burns (2006–08)
  Michael Thwaite (2006–08)
 Belarus
  Andrey Hlebasolaw (1992)
  Mikhail Sivakov (2011)
 Bosnia and Herzegovina
  Semir Štilić (2014–15), (2017)
 Bulgaria
  Tsvetan Genkov (2011–13)
 Cameroon
  Serge Branco (2010–11)
  Guy Armand Feutchine (1996–97)

 Costa Rica
  Felicio Brown Forbes (2020–22)
  Júnior Díaz (2008–10), (2011–12)
 Czech Republic
  Jan Kliment (2021–22)
  Zdeněk Ondrášek (2016–18), (2022–)
 Estonia
  Sergei Pareiko (2011–13)
 Georgia
  Heorhiy Tsitaishvili (2022)
 Ghana
  Yaw Yeboah (2020–21)
 Haiti
  Wilde-Donald Guerrier (2013–16)
  Emmanuel Sarki (2013–16)
 Honduras
  Osman Chávez (2010–15)
  Romell Quioto (2012)
 Hungary
  Richárd Guzmics (2014–16)
 Israel
  Maor Melikson (2011–13)
  Alon Turgeman (2020)
 Kazakhstan
  Georgy Zhukov (2020–22)
 Lithuania
  Arūnas Pukelevičius (1998)
 Luxembourg
  Tim Hall (2021)
 Macedonia
  Ostoja Stjepanović (2013–15)
  Enis Fazlagić (2022–)
 Moldova
  Ilie Cebanu (2007–09)
 Montenegro
  Fatos Bećiraj (2020)
  Vukan Savićević (2019–20)
 Morocco
  Nourdin Boukhari (2010–11)
 Netherlands
  Kew Jaliens (2011–13)
 Nigeria
  Kalu Uche (2001–05)
 Romania
  Emilian Dolha (2006–07)
 Senegal
  Issa Ba (2010)
 Serbia
  Ivica Iliev (2011–13)
  Milan Jovanić (2010–12)
  Nikola Mitrović (2018)
  Marko Poletanović (2022)
 Slovakia
  Erik Čikoš (2010–11)
  Marek Penksa (2005–07)
  Peter Šinglár (2008–10)
  Michal Škvarka (2021–22)
  Ivan Trabalík (2002)
 Slovenia
  Boban Jović (2015–17)
  Andraž Kirm (2009–12)
  Matej Palčič (2018–19)
  Denis Popović (2015–17)
 Togo
  Lantame Ouadja (2003–04) 
 Uruguay
  Pablo Álvarez (2009–10)

Managerial history

  Imre Schlosser (1924–29)
  František Koželuh (1929–34)
  Vilmos Nyúl (1934–39)
  Otto Mazal-Skvajn (1939–46)
  Jan Kotlarczyk (1946–47)
  Artur Walter (1947–48)
  Josef Kuchynka (1948–50)
  Michał Matyas (1950–54)
  Mieczysław Gracz (1954–55)
  Artur Woźniak (1956–57)
  Josef Kuchynka (1958–59)
  Károly Kósa (1959–60)
  Karel Finek (1960–61)
  Mieczysław Gracz (1961–62)
  Karel Kolsky (1963–64)
  Czesław Skoraczyński (1964–67)
  Mieczysław Gracz (1967–69)
  Gyula Teleky (1969–70)
  Michał Matyas (1970–71)
  Marian Kurdziel (1971–72)
  Jerzy Steckiw (1972–74)
  Aleksander Brożyniak (1975–77)
  Orest Lenczyk (1977–79)
  Lucjan Franczak (1979–81)
  Wiesław Lendzion (1981–82)
  Roman Durniok (1982–83)
  Edmund Zientara (1983–84)
  Orest Lenczyk (1984–85)
  Stanisław Chemicz (1985)
  Lucjan Franczak (1985–86)
  Stanisław Cygan (1986–87)
  Aleksander Brożyniak (1987–89)
  Stanisław Chemicz (1989)
  Adam Musiał (1989)
  Bogusław Hajdas (1989)
  Adam Musiał (1990–92)
  Kazimierz Kmiecik (1992)
  Karol Pecze (1992–93)
  Marek Kusto (1993–94)
  Orest Lenczyk (1994)
  Marek Kusto (1994)
  Lucjan Franczak (1994–96)
  Kazimierz Kmiecik (1996)
  Henryk Apostel (1996–97)
  Kazimierz Kmiecik (1997)
  Wojciech Łazarek (1997–98)
  Jerzy Kowalik (1998)
  Franciszek Smuda (1998–99)
  Jerzy Kowalik (1999)
  Marek Kusto (1999–2000)
  Wojciech Łazarek (2000)
  Adam Nawałka (2000)
  Orest Lenczyk (2000–01)
  Adam Nawałka (2001)
  Franciszek Smuda (2001–02)
  Henryk Kasperczak (2002–04)
  Werner Lička (2005)
  Jerzy Engel (2005)
  Tomasz Kulawik (2005)
  Dan Petrescu (2005–06)
  Dragomir Okuka (2006)
  Adam Nawałka (2007)
  Kazimierz Moskal (2007)
  Maciej Skorża (2007–10)
  Henryk Kasperczak (2010)
  Tomasz Kulawik (2010)
  Robert Maaskant (2010–11)
  Kazimierz Moskal (2011–12)
  Michał Probierz (2012)
  Tomasz Kulawik (2012–13)
  Franciszek Smuda (2013–15)
  Kazimierz Moskal (2015)
  Tadeusz Pawłowski (2015–16)
  Dariusz Wdowczyk (2016)
  Kazimierz Kmiecik (2016)
  Kiko Ramírez (2017)
  Joan Carrillo (2018)
  Maciej Stolarczyk (2018–19)
  Artur Skowronek (2019–20)
  Peter Hyballa (2020–21)
  Kazimierz Kmiecik (2021)
  Adrián Guľa (2021–22)
  Jerzy Brzęczek (2022)
  Radosław Sobolewski (2022–)

Other sections

Esports
Wisła Kraków also has an esports division, with teams in Counter-Strike: Global Offensive and FIFA 20.

Women's basketball

The women's basketball section are one of the most successful clubs in the country, winning 25 national championships, 12 vice-championships, 13 Polish Cups and continental runners-up in 1970.

References

External links

 Official website 
 Official Wisla Supporters website
 
 The history in Wisła encyclopedia

 
Football clubs in Kraków
Association football clubs established in 1906
Multi-sport clubs in Poland
1906 establishments in Austria-Hungary
Police association football clubs in Poland
Police sports clubs